The 2012 North Hertfordshire Council election was held on 3 May 2012, at the same time as other local elections across England, Scotland and Wales. Of the 49 seats on North Hertfordshire District Council, 15 were up for election.

Labour gained three seats from the Conservatives, whilst the Conservatives gained two seats from the Liberal Democrats. The Conservatives retained overall control of the council, whilst Labour overtook the Liberal Democrats to become the second largest party.

Overall results
The overall results were as follows:

Ward results
The results for each ward were as follows. Where the previous incumbent was standing for re-election they are marked with an asterisk(*). A double dagger (‡) indicates a sitting councillor contesting a different ward.

Changes 2012–2014
Immediately after the 2012 elections, Robert Inwood, who had been elected as a Liberal Democrat for the Royston Palace ward in 2010, defected to Labour.

Two by-elections were held on 15 November 2012. The by-election in Hitchwood, Offa and Hoo ward was triggered by the death of Conservative councillor David Miller, who had been most recently elected in 2010. The by-election in Letchworth South East ward was triggered by the resignation of Conservative councillor Richard Harman, who had been elected in 2011, after being charged with various offences; he was subsequently convicted of burglary. Neither seat changed party at the resulting by-elections.

A by-election in Hitchin Oughton ward was held on 12 September 2013 following the death of Labour councillor David Billing, who was also the party's leader on the council, and had most recently been elected in 2010. Labour retained the seat.

References

2012 English local elections
2012
2010s in Hertfordshire